Nikolay Gustavovich Shilder (also: Nikolai Schilder, ; 1828 - , Saint-Petersburg) was a Russian painter. Member of the Imperial Academy of Arts.

Biography
Schilder was born to a Baltic German father. When Pavel Tretyakov bought his painting The Temptation in 1856, it marked the start of his collection (together with Vasili Khudyakov's The Smugglers) which later turned into the Tretyakov Gallery.

Shilder graduated from the Imperial Academy of Arts in Saint Petersburg. He became an academician of the Academy in 1861. Under the influence of Pavel Fedotov he painted a series of paintings devoted to the life of ordinary people. The most notable are The Temptation (1856) that started the Tretyakov Gallery and the Forced Marriage (now in the Russian Museum, Saint Peterburg). He also painted ceremonial portraits including the portrait of tsar Alexander III of Russia.

Works

References

Literary sources

External links
Nikolay Shilder in the Large Soviet Encyclopedia 
About The Temptation 

19th-century painters from the Russian Empire
20th-century Russian painters
Russian male painters
1828 births
1898 deaths
19th-century male artists from the Russian Empire
20th-century Russian male artists